Ulster people may refer to

 People from Ulster, a traditional province of Ireland
 People from Northern Ireland, a part of Ulster
 People from Ulster County, New York